Tereza Vaculíková (born  in Brno) is a Czech freestyle skier, specializing in moguls .

Vaculíková competed at the 2010 Winter Olympics for the Czech Republic. She placed 27th in the qualifying round of the moguls, failing to finish her run.

As of April 2013, her best showing at the World Championships is 11th, in the moguls event in 2011 .

Vaculíková made her World Cup debut in February 2009. As of April 2013, her best World Cup event finish is 7th place, in a dual moguls event at Are in 2010/11. Her best World Cup overall finish in moguls is 20th, in 2010/11.

References

1992 births
Living people
Olympic freestyle skiers of the Czech Republic
Freestyle skiers at the 2010 Winter Olympics
Freestyle skiers at the 2014 Winter Olympics
Sportspeople from Brno
Czech female freestyle skiers